Amyot is a surname, and may refer to:

People:
 Charles Jean-Baptiste Amyot (1799–1866), French lawyer and entomologist 
 Frank Amyot (1904–1962), Canadian Olympic gold medalist in Canoe racing
 Geneviève Amyot (1945–2000), Franco-Canadian poet and novelist
 Jacques Amyot (1513–1593), French Renaissance writer and translator, Bishop of Auxerre
 Mathieu Amyot (ca. 1629-1688), Sieur de Villeneuve, interpreter and seigneur in New France 

Places:
 Amyot, Ontario, a small community in Algoma District, Ontario, Canada

See also
 Amiot (disambiguation)